Larry Davis (December 4, 1936 – April 19, 1994) was an American electric Texas blues and soul blues musician. He is best known for co-writing the song "Texas Flood", later recorded to greater commercial success by Stevie Ray Vaughan.

Biography
Davis was born in Pine Bluff, Arkansas, and was raised in England, Arkansas, and Little Rock, Arkansas. He swapped playing the drums to learn to play the bass guitar. In the mid-1950s, he had a working partnership with Fenton Robinson, and following the recommendation of Bobby Bland was given a recording contract by Duke Records. Davis had three singles released, which included "Texas Flood" and "Angels in Houston". Thereafter, he had limited opportunity in the recording studio. He resided in St. Louis, Missouri, for a while, and played bass in Albert King's group. He also learned to play the guitar at this time; the guitar on Davis's recording of "Texas Flood" was by played by Robinson.

Several single releases on the Virgo and Kent labels followed, but in 1972 a motorcycle accident temporarily paralyzed Davis's left side. He returned a decade later with an album released by Rooster Blues, Funny Stuff, produced by Oliver Sain. He won four W. C. Handy Awards in 1982, but a decade later he was known only to blues specialists. His 1987 Pulsar LP, I Ain't Beggin' Nobody, was difficult even for blues enthusiasts to locate.

In 1992, Bullseye Blues issued another album, Sooner or Later, highlighting his booming vocals and guitar playing influenced by Albert King.

Davis died of cancer in April 1994, at the age of 57.

Selected discography
Funny Stuff (1982), Rooster Blues
I Ain't Beggin' Nobody (1987), Evidence
Sooner or Later (1992), Bullseye Blues
B. B. King Presents Larry Davis (2002)
Sweet Little Angel (2002), P-Vine Records

See also
List of electric blues musicians
List of Texas blues musicians

References

1936 births
1994 deaths
People from Pine Bluff, Arkansas
Musicians from St. Louis
African-American guitarists
American blues guitarists
American male bass guitarists
American blues singers
Songwriters from Arkansas
Songwriters from Missouri
Electric blues musicians
Deaths from cancer in California
Texas blues musicians
Soul-blues musicians
20th-century American bass guitarists
Singers from Arkansas
Singers from Missouri
Guitarists from Missouri
Guitarists from Arkansas
African-American male songwriters
20th-century African-American male singers